Bridge No. 122, spanning the Santiago River near Naguabo, Puerto Rico, is significant as "one of the earliest and most elegant examples of concrete beam bridges in Puerto Rico".  Built in 1918, it was "futuristic" for its time and has noteworthy architectural detail relative to others.  It was designed by Rafael Nones and built by Felix Benitez-Rexach, both engineers, both regarded as masters in their work.  Its construction was financed by Puerto Rico's second public bond issue for public works, in 1916, which raised $2 million.

The bridge was modified in 1967 but remains the best-preserved example of its type in Puerto Rico.

It was identified as historically important in a review of Puerto Rico's 640 pre-1945 bridges in 1994, and was listed on the National Register of Historic Places in 1995.

See also

Las Cabanas Bridge, another joint work of Nones and Benitez-Rexach

References

External links

, National Register of Historic Places cover documentation

Bridges completed in 1918
Road bridges on the National Register of Historic Places in Puerto Rico
Concrete bridges in the United States
1918 establishments in Puerto Rico